Montenegro competed at the 2009 World Aquatics Championships in Rome, Italy.

Water polo

Men

Group B

Eightfinals

Semifinals 9–12 places

9th place

Team Roster 

Zdravko Radic
Drasko Brguljan
Vjekoslav Paskovic
Nikola Vukcevic
Aleksandar Radović
Milan Ticic
Mladjan Janovic
Nikola Janovic
Aleksandar Ivovic
Boris Zlokovic
Vladimir Gojkovic
Predrag Jokic
Milos Scepanovic

References

Nations at the 2009 World Aquatics Championships
2009 in Montenegrin sport
Montenegro at the World Aquatics Championships